"Sign of the Times" is a song by the American heavy metal band Queensrÿche. It was released as a single in support of their 1997 album Hear in the Now Frontier. The topics of this song are of school violence prevention gone overboard, racial hatred, and corrupt politicians.

Formats and track listing 
US CD single (7243 8 83792 2 9)
"Sign of the Times" (DeGarmo) – 3:33
"Chasing Blue Sky" (Rockenfield, Tate) – 3:39
"Silent Lucidity" (DeGarmo) – 5:10
"The Killing Words" (DeGarmo, Tate) – 3:35

Charts

Weekly charts

Year-end charts

Personnel
Geoff Tate - vocals
Michael Wilton - lead guitar
Chris DeGarmo - rhythm guitar
Eddie Jackson - bass
Scott Rockenfield - drums

Additional personnel
Steve Nathan - keyboards
David Ragsdale - violin

References

External links 
 

1997 songs
1997 singles
Queensrÿche songs
EMI Records singles
Songs written by Chris DeGarmo
American hard rock songs
Song recordings produced by Peter Collins (record producer)